Those Who Are About to Die Salute You – Morituri Te Salutant is the debut album by Colosseum, released in 1969 by Fontana. It is one of the pioneering albums of jazz fusion. The title is a translation of the Latin phrase morituri te salutant that according to popular belief (but not academic agreement), gladiators addressed to the emperor before the beginning of a gladiatorial match.

The original vinyl album had the title "Colosseum" on the record label and on the spine of the cover, but the album is better known as "Those Who Are About To Die Salute You".

The album reached number 15 in the UK Albums Chart.

Background
"Debut" is the very first song Colosseum ever played as a group. Tony Reeves later recalled that "["Debut"] was actually a phrase that I remembered Mick Taylor playing with John Mayall, and I changed it a bit into a bass line. [Sings the part.] And then the band all joined in – this is what happens during rehearsals – so technically you should have everybody's name in the writing credit, including, I guess, Mick Taylor's!" 

"Mandarin" started from a series of sketches by Dave Greenslade that were based on a Japanese soft scale. Tony Reeves compiled the sketches into the main theme and arranged the song.

"Beware the Ides of March" borrows a theme of the fugue of "Toccata and Fugue in D minor" by Johann Sebastian Bach (Bach BWV 565).

Colosseum also recorded "I Can't Live Without You", which appears on the 2004 re-release as a bonus track.

Legacy

Allmusic's retrospective review is laudatory, saying the album "is a powerful one, unleashing each member's instrumental prowess at one point while consolidating each talent to form an explosive outpouring of progressive jazz/rock the next." They highly praised the variety and uniqueness of each song, the playing of the musicians, and the group's ability to create a blend of jazz, rock, and classical elements that was unconventional yet accessible. They concluded "the album never strays from its intensity or its creativity", and added that Valentyne Suite is similar and just as outstanding, even though Allmusic's official review of that album is largely negative.

It was voted number 23 in the All-Time 50 Long Forgotten Gems from Colin Larkin's All Time Top 1000 Albums.

Track listing

UK release

US release
In the United States, the album was released in July 1969 on the Dunhill label with a different tracklist and a different cover.

2004 remastered release
A remastered version was released in 2004 on Sanctuary Records.
Tracks 1-8 were the same as the original UK album.

Track 9: Studio outtake.

Track 10: Recorded 12-Dec-1968, broadcast 17-Jan-1969 – BBC "Top Gear". At that point, the name of the band was Jon Hiseman's Colosseum.

Tracks 11 to 13: Recorded 24-Feb-1969, broadcast 16-Mar-1969 – BBC "Symonds On Sunday".

Track 14: With Brian Matthews voiceover, BBC Top Of The Pops".

Personnel 
Colosseum
Dave Greenslade – Hammond organ, vibraphone, piano, backing vocals on "The Road She Walked Before"
Dick Heckstall-Smith – tenor and soprano saxophone
James Litherland – guitar (except on "Backwater "Blues"), lead vocals
Tony Reeves – bass guitar
Jon Hiseman – drums
with:
Jim Roche – guitar on "Backwater Blues"
Henry Lowther – trumpet on "Walking in the Park"
Technical
Adrian Kerridge - engineer
Linda Glover - sleeve design
Richard Sterling - front cover photography

References

1969 debut albums
Colosseum (band) albums
Albums produced by Gerry Bron
Fontana Records albums
Bronze Records albums
Dunhill Records albums